Joseph Reed "Joe"  Lane (May 6, 1858 – May 1, 1931) was an attorney and a one-term Republican U.S. Representative from Iowa's 2nd congressional district at the close of the 19th century.

Lane was born in Davenport, Iowa, as the son of local attorney James T. Lane and his wife Annie. He attended the public schools in Davenport.
He was graduated from Knox College, Galesburg, Illinois, in 1878 and from the University of Iowa College of Law at Iowa City, Iowa in 1880.
He was admitted to the bar in the latter year and commenced practice in Davenport with his father's law firm, the predecessor to the Lane & Waterman firm. 
He served as a regent of the University of Iowa, and was a member of the Davenport City Council from 1884 to 1889.

In 1898, incumbent Republican Congressman George M. Curtis refused to run for a third term as representative of Iowa's 2nd congressional district, and no clear replacement as Republican nominee emerged prior to the party's district nominating convention.  At that convention, Lane became a candidate and was chosen by acclamation. After defeating John J. Ney in the general election, Lane served in the Fifty-sixth Congress (March 4, 1899 – March 3, 1901).

In July 1900 he made the surprising announcement that would not seek re-election, citing personal and private business reasons.  He resumed the practice of law in Davenport. He served as delegate to the Republican National Convention in 1908.

Lane died in Davenport on May 1, 1931. He was interred in Oakdale Cemetery.

References

1858 births
Iowa lawyers
Iowa city council members
1931 deaths
University of Iowa College of Law alumni
Politicians from Davenport, Iowa
Republican Party members of the United States House of Representatives from Iowa